Ernie Clark, A.C.S. is an Australian cinematographer known for the feature films Peaches, Run Chrissie Run! and Robbery Under Arms.  He is currently President of the South Australian Branch of the Australian Cinematographers Society and Assistant Treasurer on the Federal Executive.  He was inducted into the A.C.S. Hall of Fame in 2006.

Career
Ernie Clark joined the film industry in 1971 as a trainee in the camera department at Browning Productions in Melbourne at the age of seventeen, where he was given an education in the film industry by director Mike Browning.
 
In 1976 Ernie joined Total Film & Video Productions as lighting cameraman. A few years later he went freelance, filming TV commercials, as well as drama. His first major drama production was the mini series about Ned Kelly, The Last Outlaw, shot in 1980.

He shot a mini series for the South Australian Film Corporation and Adelaide became his adopted home. Apart from a stint as Director/DOP at Great Southern Films Melbourne in 1985-86, it has been his base ever since.
 
During the early eighties Ernie was involved in many feature film projects including the TV miniseries Robbery Under Arms and Under Capricorn, and the feature films Indecent Obsession and Run Chrissie Run!. Between these projects he filmed TV commercials for Directors Film & Video in Adelaide.

In 1986 he established the commercial production company Great Southern Films Adelaide.
 
Australian Cinematographers Society accreditation was bestowed on him in 1983.

In 2006 was inducted into the ACS Hall of Fame.

In 2003 the Adelaide Art Directors Club presented Ernie the President's Prize for services to the advertising industry. He has gained numerous awards for cinematography and direction including the AADC Master's Chair Craft Award in 2010.
 
He is actively involved in the SA branch of the ACS, first joining the committee in 1996.

He became SA President in 2003 and has been President and sponsorship co-ordinator since 2008.
 
Ernie became one of the National Vice Presidents in 2008 and is involved in committees including Policy, Hall of Fame and Awards Categories. He has judged many State and National ACS awards and been on a number of Accreditation panels.

Clark has a long history in advertising, working with some of the "world’s biggest brands and in particular automotive commercials such as Volkswagen, Mazda, Ford, Holden, Mitsubishi and Subaru",

Awards
Clark won the A.C.S. Features Gold award for Peaches in 2004.

He was inducted into the ACS Hall of Fame in 2006.

In March 2010, he won the "highly coveted Masters Chair award" at the 33rd Annual Adelaide Advertising and Design Club Awards.

Most recently (2010), Clark won the A.C.S. Gold award for the Rural Bank "Symphony" Television Commercial.

Selected filmography

Cinematographer
Injury Time (short) (2014)
A World Away (short) (2008)
You Better Watch Out (short) (2006)
The Agreement (short) (2006)
Peaches (2004)
Vaudeville (TV documentary) (1992)
Body Business (TV movie) (1986)
Run Chrissie Run! (1986)
An Indecent Obsession (1985)
Robbery Under Arms (1985)
The Settlement (1984)
Chase Through the Night (TV movie) (1983)
Under Capricorn (TV mini-series) (1983)
Sara Dane (TV movie) (1982)
The Last Outlaw (TV mini-series) (1980)
The Coast Town Kids (TV series) (1980)

Director
Moloch (2001)
Spank! (1999)

External links 
 
 SAFC Practitioners, Ernie Clark ACS
 Australian Cinematographers Society, Ernie Clark ACS

References

Australian cinematographers
Australian film directors
Living people
People from South Australia
Year of birth missing (living people)